Alex Tobiasson Harris is a Swedish Muay Thai kickboxer training at Fighter Muay Thai in Gothenburg, Sweden. He is the current WMC World Super Middleweight champion.

Biography

A technical Thai boxer with a leaning towards flamboyance, Harris won  the Swedish national Muay Thai championships in 2008, 2010 and 2012. Late 2011 saw him earn one of his biggest wins when he fought the K-1 MAX standout Yoshihiro Sato and took a unanimous decision win.

On April 28, 2012, he challenged Aiello Batonon from France for the WMC World Super Middleweight title. After 5 rounds Harris had all judges on his side. Harris is the fifth Sweden ever to conquer a WMC World title. He successfully defended his title on the 16 November 2012 knocking out Pidsanu 'Madsua' Kinchat from Thailand. He defended it for a second time with a unanimous decision win against Frenchman Yohan Lidon in Monte Carlo, Monaco on June 14, 2014.

Kickboxing record

|-
|-  bgcolor="#CCFFCC"
| 2014-06-14 || Win ||align=left| Yohan Lidon || Monte Carlo Fighting Masters 2014 || Monte Carlo, Monaco || Decision (Unanimous) || 5 || 3:00
|-
! style=background:white colspan=9 |
|-
|-  bgcolor="#CCFFCC"
| 2012-11-16 || Win ||align=left| Madsua || Rumble of the Kings 2012 || Linköping, Sweden || KO (Knee) || 3 || 
|-
! style=background:white colspan=9 |
|-
|-  bgcolor="#FFBBBB"
| 2012-05-26 || Loss ||align=left| Nieky Holzken || Glory 1: Stockholm || Stockholm, Sweden || TKO (3 knockdowns/liver shots)|| 2 || 2:42
|-
|-  bgcolor="#CCFFCC"
| 2012-04-28 || Win ||align=left| Aiello Batonon ||  || Brest, France || Decision (Unanimous) || 5 || 3:00
|-
! style=background:white colspan=9 |
|-  bgcolor="#CCFFCC"
| 2011-11-27 || Win ||align=left| Yoshihiro Sato ||  ||  || Decision (Unanimous) || 3 || 3:00
|-
| colspan=9 | Legend:

References

External links
http://www.fightermuaythai.com

Swedish male kickboxers
Swedish Muay Thai practitioners
Sportspeople from Gothenburg
Living people
Year of birth missing (living people)